Leviathan (roller coaster) may refer to:

 Leviathan (Canada's Wonderland), a steel roller coaster at Canada's Wonderland
 Leviathan (Sea World), a wooden roller coaster at Sea World in Australia